As of 2019, the Pomeranian Voivodeship, Poland, contained 35 towns (governed by a town mayor or burmistrz), as well as 7 cities (governed by a city mayor or prezydent miasta), including 4 cities with powiat rights.

Table by population on 2019, including two non-administrative metropolitan areas, namely the Tricity and the Little Kashubian Tricity.

External links
 Polish Central Statistical Office (GUS)